The Byrd Glacier is a major glacier in Antarctica, about  long and  wide, draining an extensive area of the polar plateau and flowing eastward between the Britannia Range and Churchill Mountains to discharge into the Ross Ice Shelf at Barne Inlet. It was named by the NZ-APC after Rear Admiral Byrd, US Navy Antarctic explorer.

On the south side of Byrd Glacier is Blake Massif.

See also
 Glaciology
 Ice stream
 List of Antarctic ice streams
 List of glaciers in the Antarctic
 List of places in Antarctica below sea level
 Denman Glacier

References

Ice streams of Antarctica
Glaciers of Oates Land
Glaciers of Hillary Coast